Dalwallinu ( or ), colloquially called Dally, is a town in the Wheatbelt region of Western Australia, located 248 km from Perth via the Great Northern Highway. Agriculture and supporting industries are the town's primary economic activities. The town is the first town on the Wildflower Way, a tourist route that stretches north to Mullewa. At the 2016 census, Dalwallinu had a population of 699.

The name of the town comes from a now unknown Aboriginal word that means "place to wait a while" or possibly "good lands". Traditionally, the Badimaya people lived in the northern areas of the shire and the Karlamaya people inhabited the southern areas.

Originally called South Nugadong, the town was officially gazetted in 1914.

The first Europeans to arrive were Benedictine monks who came from New Norcia to graze their sheep on the pastoral leases that they had taken up. The first settlers arrived, hoping to develop the lands for wheat, in 1907. 
The region was surveyed in 1909 and then opened for selection in 1910 with crops being planted shortly afterward.

Two brothers, Albert and Frederick Ellison, built a well on the southern end of the township in 1909. The well acted as a permanent source of water to the settlers. The well, named Billum Billum well, was built from locally occurring timber such as gimlet and salmon gum.

In 1932 the Wheat Pool of Western Australia announced that the town would have two grain elevators, each fitted with an engine, installed at the railway siding.
Dalwallinu is on the railway route that used to be utilised for Northam to Mullewa rail services, such as The Mullewa.  They no longer operate, with the line inoperational between Dalwallinu and Perenjori South.

References

External links

Towns in Western Australia
Wheatbelt (Western Australia)